Matroosberg (Afrikaans for 'Sailor Mountain') is a peak in the South African Hex River Mountains, which belong to the Cape Fold Belt. The mountain is located in the Witzenberg Local Municipality in the Western Cape.

The mountain got its name because a rock formation below the summit is said to resemble a sailor next to their ship when viewed from the south.

The closest town is De Doorns in the south, around eleven kilometers away. The private Matroosberg Nature Reserve is operated on the Erfdeel farm. From there, it is reachable to the summit by four-wheel drive. In winter, the mountain is often covered with snow; There is a small ski area on the north slope, which is the seat of the South African Ski Association.

The longest of the four Hex River Tunnels on the Cape Town–Johannesburg railway line runs below Matroosberg. Matroosberg station is located on the former route over the Hex River Pass and is still used today as the end of special trips.

References

Mountains of the Western Cape